Oliver Pike (born 2 April 1998) is a Welsh cricketer. He made his first-class debut on 28 March 2017 for Cardiff MCCU against Glamorgan as part of the Marylebone Cricket Club University fixtures.

Personal life
He is the cousin of Welsh footballer Gareth Bale and the son of former Cardiff City footballer Chris Pike.

References

External links
 

1998 births
Living people
Welsh cricketers
Cardiff MCCU cricketers
Alumni of Cardiff University
Sportspeople from Bridgend
Wales National County cricketers